Charles Smith Scott Memorial Observatory, also known as Park College Observatory, is a historic observatory located on the campus of Park University at Parkville, Platte County, Missouri.  It was built in 1896, and is a variation of the "T"-plan observatory building style constructed of ashlar limestone blocks. It features an octagonal two-story domed tower.

It was listed on the National Register of Historic Places in 1992.  The observatory burned down in 1999 and was subsequently razed.

See also
 List of astronomical observatories

References

Astronomical observatories in Missouri
University and college buildings on the National Register of Historic Places in Missouri
School buildings completed in 1896
Buildings and structures in Platte County, Missouri
National Register of Historic Places in Platte County, Missouri